The 2007 Formula BMW UK season was the fourth and final Formula BMW season based in United Kingdom whose mission was to develop talented young drivers and introduce them to auto racing using full-size cars. The series was part of the support race package for the BTCC.

Teams and drivers
All teams were British-registered.

Results and Standings
All rounds were held in United Kingdom.

Races

Drivers

Pole positions highlighted in bold(= 1 point)

External links
 formula1.cc

Formula BMW seasons
Formula BMW
BMW UK